Châtel-en-Trièves is a commune in the department of Isère, southeastern France. The municipality was established on 1 January 2017 by merger of the former communes of Saint-Sébastien (the seat) and Cordéac.

See also 
Communes of the Isère department

References 

Communes of Isère